The 2022 Spanish motorcycle Grand Prix (officially known as the Gran Premio Red Bull de España) was the sixth round of the 2022 Grand Prix motorcycle racing season and the first round of the 2022 MotoE World Cup. All races (except MotoE race 1, which was held on 30 April) were held at the Circuito de Jerez-Ángel Nieto in Jerez de la Frontera on 1 May 2022.

Background

Riders' entries 
In the MotoGP class, the presence of two wildcards in the entry list of the race should be noted: Lorenzo Savadori, in his second consecutive race after the Portuguese Grand Prix, and Stefan Bradl, who had already replaced Marc Márquez in the Repsol Honda Team in the Grand Prix of Argentina. In the Moto2 class, Stefano Manzi replaces Keminth Kubo in the Yamaha VR46 Master Camp Team, following the diagnosis of costochondritis found on the Thai rider after FP1. In the Moto3 class, in addition to the presence of Gerard Riu to replace David Muñoz, David Salvador replaces for the third consecutive race John McPhee, stopped due to injury, and the Malaysian rider Syarifuddin Azman replaces Alberto Surra (also injured) as in the Grand Prix of Portugal. In the MotoE class, which debuts in this Grand Prix, Bradley Smith of the WithU GRT RNF MotoE Team, following the crash at the 24 Hours of Le Mans, he is forced to give up this stage and is replaced by Lukas Tulovic, while the Spanish rider Yeray Ruiz replaces the starting rider Xavier Cardelús in the Avintia Esponsorama Racing, absent due to injury.

MotoGP Championship standings before the race 
Fabio Quartararo, winner of the Portuguese Grand Prix, and Álex Rins lead the riders' standings with 69 points, 3 more than Aleix Espargaró, 8 more than Enea Bastianini (previous leader) and 18 more than Johann Zarco. In the constructors' classification, Ducati is confirmed first with 106 points, followed by KTM and Suzuki, both at 70 points, Yamaha at 70 points, which overtakes Aprilia by 1 point and Honda at 44 points. The top five positions in the team standings are occupied by Team Suzuki Ecstar (115 points), Aprilia Racing (91 points), Monster Energy Yamaha MotoGP (86 points), Red Bull KTM Factory Racing (81 points) and Pramac Racing (79 points).

Moto2 Championship standings before the race 
Celestino Vietti leads the riders' classification with 90 points with a wide margin on the first rivals, enclosed in 7 points: Ai Ogura (59 points), Tony Arbolino (54 points), Joe Roberts (winner in Portimão) and Arón Canet (49 points). The constructors' classification sees Kalex with 125 points, Boscoscuro with 20 points and MV Agusta with 5 points. In the team standings, Idemitsu Honda Team Asia is confirmed in the lead with 101 points, with an advantage of 11 points over Mooney VR46 Racing Team, 12 over Elf Marc VDS Racing Team, 13 over Flexbox HP40 and 51 over to Liqui Moly Intact GP.

Moto3 Championship standings before the race 
Sergio García and Dennis Foggia continue to exchange at the helm of the riders' standings, with the Spaniard, winner of the previous race, who precedes the Italian by only one point (83 vs 82 points). Jaume Masià is third with 54 points, followed by Andrea Migno and Deniz Öncü 4 points behind. In the constructors' classification, Gas Gas and Honda are paired in first place with 99 points, followed by KTM with 82 points, Husqvarna with 56 points and CFMoto, who closes with 50 points. Aspar Team overtakes Leopard Racing at the top of the team standings (131 points for the first, 109 for the second); Red Bull KTM Ajo is third with 70 points, 2 more than CFMoto Racing Prüstel GP and 13 more than Red Bull KTM Tech3.

Free practice

MotoGP 
The first session sees the Suzuki bikes of Joan Mir and Álex Rins in front of everyone, with Álex Márquez third. In the second session, Fabio Quartararo precedes Enea Bastianini and Francesco Bagnaia. The latter was the fastest in the third session (and in the combined standings) ahead of Quartararo and Takaaki Nakagami.

Combined Free Practice 1-2-3 
The top ten riders (written in bold) qualified in Q2.

Free practice 4 
In the fourth session, Francesco Bagnaia was the fastest ahead of Fabio Quartararo and Joan Mir.

Moto2 
Jake Dixon dominated free practice by setting the best time in all three sessions: in the first he preceded Sam Lowes and Augusto Fernández; in the second the English finished ahead of Fernández and Ai Ogura; in the third he put Lowes and Barry Baltus behind him.

Combined Free Practice 1-2-3 
The top fourteen riders (written in bold) qualified in Q2.

Note 

 Keminth Kubo played the first session (1:44.403) but was forced to give up the Grand Prix following the diagnosis of costochondritis. The Yamaha VR46 Master Camp Team replaced him with Stefano Manzi.

Moto3 
In the first session, Deniz Öncü was the fastest, followed by Ayumu Sasaki and Sergio García. In the second session, Izan Guevara finished in the lead, ahead of Sasaki and Jaume Masià. In the third session, Diogo Moreira set the best time ahead of Guevara and David Salvador.

Combined Free Practice 1-2-3 
The top fourteen riders (written in bold) qualified in Q2.

Notes 

 Joshua Whatley played the first session (1: 52.982), but was forced to leave the Grand Prix due to a crash.
 Lorenzo Fellon played the first session (1:50.277) and the second session (1:47.590), but was forced to leave the Grand Prix due to a dislocated right shoulder.

MotoE

Combined Free Practice 1 and 2 
The top eight riders (written in bold) qualified in Q2.

Qualifying

MotoGP

Moto2

Moto3

MotoE

Race

MotoGP

Moto2

Moto3

MotoE

Race 1 

All bikes manufactured by Energica.

Race 2 

All bikes manufactured by Energica.

Championship standings after the race
Below are the standings for the top five riders, constructors, and teams after the round.

MotoGP

Riders' Championship standings

Constructors' Championship standings

Teams' Championship standings

Moto2

Riders' Championship standings

Constructors' Championship standings

Teams' Championship standings

Moto3

Riders' Championship standings

Constructors' Championship standings

Teams' Championship standings

MotoE

References

External links

2022 MotoGP race reports
motorcycle Grand Prix
2022
motorcycle Grand Prix
motorcycle Grand Prix